Joan Mavis Rosanove (11 May 1896 – 8 April 1974) was an Australian lawyer and advocate for the rights of women to practice law, and the first woman in Australia to take silk.

Joan Rosanove was born in Ballarat, Australia. Her father Mark Aaron Lazarus was a barrister and solicitor; both her parents were non-practicing Jews. She attended the Loreto convent school and Clarendon Ladies' College; she was articled to her father in 1917 and began to attend the University of Melbourne to study law. She was formally admitted to practice as a barrister and solicitor on 2 June 1919.

In 1920 she married Emmanuel ('Mannie') Rosanove, a dermatologist, and they had two daughters. In 1923 the family moved to Melbourne, and in September that year she was the first woman in Victoria to sign the Victorian Bar roll. She could not obtain room in the Selborne Chambers, but established a successful practice nonetheless, acting mainly in criminal and divorce cases.

In November 1934 Rosanove represented Egon Kisch in Melbourne when he defied his immigration exclusion order and leapt five meters on to the deck of Station Pier breaking his right leg.

The Rosanoves travelled to Canada, the United States of America and Britain in between 1932 and 1933. When they returned to Melbourne they lived at Toorak. In 1949 Joan again signed the Bar roll and achieved her ambition to practise from Selborne Chambers by accepting a position as 'reader' to a male barrister Edward Ellis. She took over his room when he moved to Western Australia. From 1954 Rosanove submitted a number of applications in Victoria to be made a QC. That she had to wait until 16 November 1965 to be appointed led many of her peers to conclude that 'she had been shabbily treated'. In 1967 she took her struggle for the rights of women lawyers to New South Wales.

Woman in a wig: Joan Rosanove, QC, a biography written by Isabel Ray Carter, was published in 1970. In 1999 the Victorian Bar named their Melbourne offices the Joan Rosanove Chambers in her honour.

See also 
 First women lawyers around the world

References 

Lawyers from Melbourne
1896 births
1974 deaths
Australian people of Jewish descent
19th-century Australian women
20th-century Australian women